CAQ can refer to:

 Center for Audit Quality, an American NGO concerned with accounting standards and regulations
 Chinese Association for Quality
 Computer-aided quality assurance, using computers to assure quality in manufacturing
  ('Coalition for Quebec's Future'), a political party in Quebec
  ('Quito German School'), a German international school in Quito, Ecuador